Peter Boyne (born 24 May 1944) is a former Australian rules footballer who played for the Collingwood in the VFL.

Boyne was an extremely reliable defender recruited from  North Heidelberg. He played at full-back in Collingwood's losing 1966 Grand Final side in which he had 5 goals kicked on him by Kevin Neale.

Aged 24, his career was cut short when he injured his knee during the 1968 Season. He failed to play again. Boyne failed to kick a single goal and ended with one solitary behind in his 60-game career.

References 

1944 births
Australian rules footballers from Victoria (Australia)
Collingwood Football Club players
North Heidelberg Football Club players
Living people